First Baptist Church is a historic Baptist church in Columbia, Missouri. In 1823, at the time of its founding, it was the first and only church in Columbia. The Church and its members have played a prominent role in civic and religious affairs in Missouri. The church's Georgian Revival style sanctuary sits conspicuously on Broadway in Downtown Columbia; it is the fourth church building and second at that location. Stephens College, formerly a baptist institution founded by church members, is across the street. First Baptist has both a traditional and contemporary Sunday services, and formerly hosted a Swahili-language congregation. The church is affiliated with the American Baptist Churches USA. In 2001, the congregation joined the Cooperative Baptist Fellowship and its longtime affiliation with the Southern Baptist Convention was ended. In 2004, the Odyssey Chamber Music Series was founded as part of a community outreach effort. In addition, the Plowman Chamber Music Competition, Columbia Handbell Ensemble, Esterhazy Quartet, and the University of Missouri School of Music utilize the sanctuary as a performance venue. William Jewell, namesake of William Jewell College in Liberty, Missouri, has been described as the leading force behind the creation of the church. The first meeting took place in the home of Charles Hardin, father of Charles Henry Hardin governor of Missouri.

History
Columbia was founded in 1818 as the county seat of Boone County. A hallmark of frontier life in the Boonslick was lack of organized religion. As Columbia was growing into a proper town, it was natural that like-minded thinkers would join together in Christian fellowship. First Baptist Church was organized on 22 November 1823 in the home of Charles Hardin on Locust street between 4th and 5th streets, now Flat Branch Park. This was the first brick residence Columbia. The founders were formerly members of Little Bonne Femme Baptist Church south of Columbia who granted letters of dismiss after a dispute involving William Jewell. The church continued to meet in homes or outside in fair weather until September 1826 when the church met regularly in the Boone County Courthouse. In 1824 the first dedicated church building was constructed as a union church between the Methodist and the Baptist. Two wealthy men—William Jewell, a Baptist, and Moses Payne, a Methodist—funded the construction. This building was used for twenty years.

A new church building was erected in the 1850s on the Boone County Courthouse square. The congregation continued to worship here for four decades. In 1891 the church moved to its current location, purchasing a lot on Broadway next to Stephens College, at the time a Baptist Women's College. On this lot was erected a beautiful Victorian Neo-Gothic structure, complete with pipe organ and stained glass. In 1927 the addition of the extant educational building was added. Limited seating capacity and poor upkeep lead to the destruction of the sanctuary and its replacement In 1957 with the current sanctuary. This new sanctuary was connected to the educational building in the 1960s.

The founders of Columbia were from the Upland South, largely Virginia, Kentucky, and Tennessee. As such, many were enslaved African-Americans. Charles Hardin and William Jewell were both slave owners. Until the civil war it was common for slaves to join their masters church. Not until after the Civil War did the congregations segregate, in Columbia newly emancipated slaves formed Second Baptist Church—still a predominantly black church today.

The Stephens family, leaders in business, religion, and civic affairs, were lifetime members. This includes both Edwin William Stephens and his father James Stephens, namesake of Stephens College. The college's historical quad sits across Waugh Street.

References

External links
First Baptist Church Website

Churches completed in 1957
Baptist churches in Missouri
Churches in Columbia, Missouri
1823 establishments in Missouri
Music venues in Columbia, Missouri